Pearl River is a hamlet and census-designated place in the town of Orangetown, Rockland County, New York, United States. It is east of Chestnut Ridge, south of Nanuet, west of Blauvelt, New York, and north of Montvale and Old Tappan, New Jersey. The population was 15,876 at the 2010 census.

It is the first (traveling north) of three New York stops on New Jersey Transit's Pascack Valley Line.

History 

In 1696, Pearl River was part of a larger piece of land known as the Kakiat Patent that was granted to Daniel Honan and Michael Hawdon. In 1713, the land was split into north and south plots. After the Revolutionary War, the land was further divided and sold. Pearl River was a piece of land made up of woods and swamps originally called Muddy Creek.

In the early 1870s, the town was divided into five different parts: Middletown, Sickletown, Pascack, Muddy Brook, and Naurashaun.

There are conflicting accounts on how Muddy Creek came to be named Pearl River. According to some historians, a town resident named Ves Bogert found small pearls in mussels that thrived in Muddy Brook and, upon hearing this, the wife of John Demarest, the president of the New Jersey and New York Railroad, suggested the name "Pearl River" to him.

Another account is that the name change was made to make the station sound more appealing on railroad schedules. A third account is that Julius E. Braunsdorf wanted to enhance the hamlet's business image by renaming it Pearl River. In any event, there is no body of water near the hamlet called Pearl River; the most significant stream is Muddy Brook.

Braunsdorf, an industrialist and German immigrant, purchased Muddy Creek in 1870. He donated a long strip of land through the center of his property to the New Jersey and New York Railroad to enable it to bring an extension of the line from Hillsdale, New Jersey north to Nanuet.

Braunsdorf was the "Father of Pearl River" and established Aetna Sewing Machine Company to produce his patented home sewing machine in 1872. Later that year the first post office was established in the hamlet and from then on it was known as Pearl River.

Braunsdorf invented and manufactured the carbon-arc light bulb in 1873, six years before Thomas Edison's carbonized filament version. It was installed and used on ships in New York harbor for loading and unloading operations. He also designed generators, one of which powered the first incandescent electric lights, which he also invented, in the nation's capital.

When Braunsdorf designed the street layout, the only existing streets were Pearl Street and Washington Avenue. He drew a wide main street through the middle of town and called it Central Avenue. Parallel to Central Avenue he drew Franklin, after his hero, Benjamin Franklin. To connect Washington, Central, and Franklin he drew three streets and named them William, John and Henry, after his sons.

Braunsdorf built:
 1872 – The Aetna Sewing Machine Company, the largest factory in Pearl River, and ceded land to the railroad company so workers from New York City could get to his factory.
 1872 – The Pearl River Post Office and became the first Postmaster.
 1873 – Two brick train stations (passenger/freight) still in use today.
 The Pearl River Hotel
 Low-cost housing for the factory employees he attracted from Germany and Scandinavia.

In 1894, Talbot C. Dexter moved his Dexter Folder Company to Pearl River. On August 25, 1885, Dexter filed a patent for an automatic folding machine that changed the way newspapers, books, and magazines were folded and assembled. Between 1885 and 1913, Dexter filed many patents, some still in use today.

In 1907, Ernst J. Lederle, former New York City Health Commissioner, established the Lederle Antitoxin Laboratories in Pearl River. In 1930, it became Lederle Laboratories, a division of American Cyanamid. During World War II, Lederle was a major supplier of vaccines and blood plasma to the U.S. armed forces.

In 1931, Gottfried (Fred) Schmidt invented the automatic pinsetter. Brunswick was not interested in an automatic machine at the time. In 1937, AMF acquired the patent rights to this early machine—The “Sch-Bec-Roy”, which stood for Schmidt (inventor), Beckerle (bowling alley proprietor) and McElroy (blueprint designer).

In 1955, Pearl River was the setting for Norby, an NBC situation comedy that aired from January to April of that year and was one of the first regular television series filmed in color. It starred David Wayne as a small-town banker who lived and worked in Pearl River, where the 13 episodes of the series were filmed.

In 2011, CNNMoney.com ranked Pearl River 78th on its annual "100 Best Places to Live" list.

Geography
Pearl River is located at  (41.0591,-74.02025).

Demographics

As of the census of 2000, there were 21,042 people, 5,539 households, and 4,209 families residing in the CDP. The population density was 3,273.2 per square mile (877.9/km2). There were 5,636 housing units at an average density of 823.8/sq mi (318.1/km2). The racial makeup of the CDP was 72.37% White, 6.39% African American, 0.05% Native American, 7.16% Asian, 0.02% Pacific Islander, 0.57% from other races, and 0.68% from two or more races. Hispanic or Latino of any race were 6.44% of the population.

There were 5,539 households, out of which 33.6% had children under the age of 18 living with them, 64.4% were married couples living together, 8.4% had a female householder with no husband present, and 24.0% were non-families. 20.7% of all households were made up of individuals, and 8.3% had someone living alone who was 65 years of age or older. The average household size was 2.79 and the average family size was 3.26.

In the CDP, the population was spread out, with 25.3% under the age of 18, 6.0% from 18 to 24, 29.3% from 25 to 44, 24.7% from 45 to 64, and 14.6% who were 65 years of age or older. The median age was 39 years. For every 100 females, there were 93.6 males. For every 100 females age 18 and over, there were 91.3 males.

The median income for a household in the CDP was $76,692, and the median income for a family was $91,618. Males had a median income of $58,966 versus $39,452 for females. The per capita income for the CDP was $31,417. About 2.2% of families and 3.4% of the population were below the poverty line, including 3.1% of those under age 18 and 4.7% of those age 65 or over.

Pearl River has a large Irish community and, under the auspices of the Ancient Order of Hibernians, hosts New York State's second-largest Saint Patrick's Day parade, typically on the Sunday after St. Patrick's Day. This large Irish-American population also supports the nation's largest youth Gaelic Athletic Football team.

Commerce

Lederle Laboratories (which became Wyeth) was founded in 1907 on a Pearl River farm by Ernst J. Lederle. The site grew to encompass  and 40 buildings, and employ 4,000 workers. After Pfizer acquired Wyeth in 2009, the number of employees at the site was greatly reduced, and most of the campus was sold in the mid-2010s. Streets and a pond on the campus are named after scientists and inventors:

Pearl River is the site of Blue Hill Plaza, an office complex that includes Rockland County's first commercial skyscraper, completed in 1972.

Education

The community is served by the Pearl River School District. Pearl River High School serves students in grades 8 through 12. It enrolls about 1,000 students. 96% of the class of 2009 continued on to college, university, or technical school.

In 2001, the Pearl River School District won the Malcolm Baldrige National Quality Award. 
In 2008 and 2014, Franklin Avenue Elementary School was a U.S. Department of Education Blue Ribbon School of Excellence Award winner. 
In 2011, Pearl River Middle School was a Blue Ribbon School of Excellence Award winner.
In 2017, U.S. News & World Report ranked Pearl River High School with a Silver award as the 76th Best High School in New York State and 727th in the nation.
U.S. News ranked Pearl River High School the best high school in Rockland County in 2019.
In 2020, Niche.com ranked the Pearl River School District's COVID-19 pandemic school reopening plan as "excellent".

Saint Margaret School is a Catholic school serving grades Pre-K through 8.

Emergency services

Fire departments
Excelsior Fire Engine Company #1 of Pearl River is on the three-way intersection of Michael Kernan Drive, Hillside Avenue, and Route 304. Pearl River Hook & Ladder Company #1 is on Central Avenue, next to Central Avenue Field.

Medical services
Pearl River has an alumni-founded ambulance corps that has a station at 15 N. Pearl Street (Route 304).

Police service
The Orangetown Police Department provides police service for Pearl River.

Sports
The Pearl River High School Pirates have athletic programs such as baseball, basketball, football, swimming, softball, ice hockey, lacrosse, volleyball, field hockey, bowling, soccer, track, wrestling, and chess club.

The 2010 Pearl River High School girls' softball team won the New York State Championship.

Tourism

Historical markers
 Cuyper-Van Houten House, 66 Sickletown Road
 Johannes Perry House, 49 Elizabeth Street
 Scherer House, 599 Orangeburg Road

Landmarks and places of interest

 Braunsdorf Park Pearl River, Central Avenue & South Main Street – named after Julius Braunsdorf, first industrial developer of Pearl River and inventor of various models of sewing machines, newspaper printing presses, carbon arc light bulbs, and electric generators. His sewing machine factory is now the Dexter industrial complex. Braunsdorf installed the world's first indoor lighting at the U.S. Capitol.
 Edward Salyer House (NRHP)
 Jacob P. Perry House, 15 Sickletown Road – Built in 1801, it is one of Rockland County's oldest Dutch Colonial Style houses and is in the historic Nauraushaun area (NRHP)
 Maria's Rock, front lawn of Lederle Laboratories, North Middletown Road – An 18th- century legend tells of a little girl named Huffy who wandered from her home in nearby Tappan and died of hunger and exposure. Tradition says that villagers found her bones near the massive boulder.
 Orangetown Museum & Archives  – 213 Blue Hill Road
 “The Spot” - The formerly wooded area along Railroad Avenue
 Pearl River United States Post Office (NRHP)
 Van Houten Farms, 68 Sickletown Road – on the eastern edge of Pearl River. Adjacent is the Van Houten/Kuyper Dutch Sandstone House, the main section built in 1732 and purchased by Van Houten circa 1812.

Notable people 
 Lori Barbero, drummer and musician 
 Christopher Carley, actor
 Robert Clohessy, actor
 Macduff Everton, photographer
 John Flaherty, television baseball broadcaster and retired Major League Baseball player
 Dan Fortmann, professional football player and physician, member of Pro Football Hall of Fame
 Brian Gaine, American football executive who was the general manager of the Houston Texans from 2018 to 2019.
 Aline Griffith, socialite, spy, and writer
 Dan Hanzus, sports writer for NFL Media, host of NFL Network's Around the NFL Podcast, host of NFL Power Rankings
 Mary Beth Keane, writer
 Dan Masterson, poet
 Mario Perillo, Perillo Tours owner also known as Mr. Italy
 Josephine Pucci, United States women's national ice hockey team member and Olympic silver medalist

References

 Knight, Robert P. Centennial history of Pearl River, New York. Pearl River Centennial Committee, 1973
 McDonald, Brian. My Father's Gun: One Family, Three Badges, One Hundred Years in the NYPD

External links

 Pearl River history
 The Railroad in Pearl River
 Pearl River Yahoo! Group
 Living in Pearl River – slideshow by The New York Times

Census-designated places in New York (state)
Hamlets in New York (state)
Irish-American neighborhoods
Census-designated places in Rockland County, New York
Hamlets in Rockland County, New York